is a tire company based in Tokyo, Japan.  The company was founded and began on October 13, 1917, in a joint venture between Yokohama Cable Manufacturing and B.F. Goodrich.  In 1969, the company expanded to the United States as Yokohama Tire Corporation. The Aspec A300 was the driving force behind its tremendous rise. Branding, especially in Japan, will often use Advan instead of Yokohama. Advan wheels and tires have a strong presence in the aftermarket scene worldwide.

The company has two manufacturing facilities in the United States: one in Salem, Virginia, and another in West Point, Mississippi.

History 
1917 - Established in Yokohama as 橫濱護謨製造株式會社 (Yokohama Rubber Manufacturing Co., Ltd.), a joint venture between 橫濱電線製造 (Yokohama Electric Cable Manufacturing Company, currently Furukawa Electric Co., Ltd.) and BF Goodrich Company.
1920 - Built a factory in Hiranuma, Yokohama. Installed US-made refining equipment and manufacturing equipments. Started manufacturing rubber belts, tires, hoses, etc. (At this time, tires of this company are sold in Japan under the "Goodrich" brand)
1929 - Built a new Yokohama Factory in Heian-cho, Tsurumi-ku, Yokohama.
1937 - Changed the tire brand to "Yokohama".
1942 - Built a rubber factory in Singapore.
1943 - Built a factory in Mie prefecture.
1946 - Built a factory in Mishima, Shizuoka Prefecture.
1950 - Stocks listed on the Tokyo Stock Exchange and the Osaka Securities Exchange.
1963 - Company name changed from 横浜護謨製造株式会社 (Yokohama Rubber Manufacturing Co., Ltd.) to 横浜ゴム株式会社(Yokohama Rubber Company, Limited).
1964 - Built a factory in Shinshiro, Aichi Prefecture.
1969 - Established Yokohama Tire Corporation in the United States.
2007 - Established Yokohama India.
In 2016 Yokohama Rubber acquired farm tire maker Alliance Tire Group for $1.18 billion.
On March 25, 2022, Yokohama Rubber announced it would be acquiring Trelleborg Wheel Systems from Trelleborg for 2.1 billion euro ($2.31 billion), its largest acquisition to date.

Sponsorship and motorsports 
From 2015 to 2020, Yokohama was the main sponsor of Premier League football club Chelsea.

Yokohama Tire sponsors the NBA teams the Boston Celtics and the San Antonio Spurs.

Yokohama is the official tire supplier of the IMSA GT3 Cup Challenge, the World Touring Car Championship and Japanese Super Formula. Yokohama has also been the official tire supplier of the Macau Grand Prix Formula 3 Intercontinental Cup race since 1983, with an exception in 2016, when Pirelli was chosen for the tire supplier that year. Yokohama is also the official tire partner of former American Le Mans Series GT2 team PTG from 2005 to 2009.

In the United States, Yokohama Tire Corporation has participated in ALMS, Red Line Time Attack, Nitro Rallycross and Stadium Super Trucks.

Logos 
The Yokohama Rubber logo was first displayed in the Tokyo Asahi Shimbun newspaper in 1917. The company used it until 1977. Since that time, a modern logo has been used. Like the old logo, the new one is the first letter in the brand name, but the letter itself is more dynamic and expressive. A similar style logo is used by the Taiwanese tire company Nankang Rubber Tire.

Wheels 
Under the Yokohama Wheel brand, Yokohama Rubber Co.,Ltd. began making wheels in 1974. The Yokohama Wheel brand currently produces the Advan Racing wheel brand for performance and motorsport applications, the AVS brand for premium applications, and the Reutzer brand for luxury applications.

References

External links

 

Companies listed on the Tokyo Stock Exchange
Companies listed on the Osaka Exchange
Tire manufacturers of Japan
Manufacturing companies based in Tokyo
Automotive companies of Japan
Japanese brands
Japanese companies established in 1917
Automotive companies established in 1917
Furukawa Group
1950s initial public offerings